Phillip Henry Matson (22 October 1884 – 13 June 1928) was a record-breaking swimmer, and both a highly successful player and coach of Australian rules football in the early 20th century, chiefly in Western Australia.

Family
The son of George Thomas Matson (1842-1915), and his wife Emma (1854-1928), née Duffield, Phillip Henry Matson, was born at Port Adelaide on 22 October 1884.

Matson was educated at state school in Adelaide before moving to Western Australia as a youth.

Lifestyle
Away from football, Matson's working was varied and somewhat inconsistent. He had stints as a miner, a tramway motorman, a farmer, a navvy on the trans-Australian railway, a lumper, a storeman and a 'Spot-Lager' retailer.

Early in his career, he was a teetotaller but eventually became a "social" drinker and was well known for his gambling habit. His unconventional approach to life caused problems within his family, who were sometimes compelled to live in a tent.

Matson offered to enlist during World War I; however, when rejected he opted to live as a licensed Swan River fisherman and involve himself more heavily in gambling. He operated two-up schools at Subiaco and Pelican Point, SP books in some city hotels, and later an illegal gaming house in Perth. For a number of years, he held a trotting bookmaker's licence.

Swimming
He worked as a navvies' water-boy in Western Australia, and began swimming competitively in 1902 and playing Australian football.

He had been encouraged to take up football by his swimming trainer, William Howson (who had, himself, established a world-record in 1904, swimming underwater for 110 yards), to  "harden himself" for his swimming.

During his swimming career, he held Western Australian freestyle titles from 100 yards (91 m) to a mile (1.6 km) using the now-obsolete trudgen stroke, and won the 220-yard breaststroke at the Australasian championships in three consecutive years (1905, 1906, and 1907).

On 19 February 1908, swimming at the Australian championships, conducted by the West Australian Amateur Swimming Association  at Claremont, Western Australia, Matson set a world record time for the 220-yard breaststroke: three minutes and fourteen seconds, winning by a length (having touched equal first at the last turn).

Seven days later, on 26 February 1908, swimming at a swimming carnival in Kalgoorie, Matson broke his own world record by another three and two-fifths seconds, when he swam the distance in three minutes and ten and three-fifths of a second. However, because a surveyor's certificate could not be produced that precisely verified the dimensions of the pool (i.e., the exact length of the swim) the governing body, the New South Wales Amateur Swimming Association, refused to ratify the new record.

Because his playing professional football at the same time precluded him from being considered for the Olympic Games, he turned professional for a £20 stake in 1909.

Football
"[Matson] himself was a wonderful footballer. His name has been bracketed with that of the late Albert Thurgood as the best player of all time. Grim, relentless, shrewd, strong as a lion, courageous and trier from start to finish, Matson was a great figure on the field." — The Sporting Globe, 20 July 1928.

"All up, Matson played and/or coached nine clubs and was involved in 13 premiership (five as a player, four as player/coach and four as coach) and four runner-up teams in 25 completed seasons." — Peter Carter.

A fast, vigorous and versatile utility with an ability to take the big mark (despite being only 179 cm), he played at half-back and half-forward and took turns in the ruck. He played for both South Australia (1909–10) and Western Australia (1908, 1911, 1914) and captained the South Australian team at the 1914 interstate carnival.

Professional
Matson supported himself playing football during an era when the game was supposedly an amateur sport. He moved clubs frequently, playing outside the main leagues if the price was right. Over 20 seasons he played for:
 South Bunbury Football Club (Western Australia): 1904–1905.
 Boulder City Football Club (Western Australia): 1906–1908. 
 Sturt (South Australia): 1909–1910.
 North Fremantle Football Club (Western Australia): 1911.
 Subiaco Football Club (Western Australia): 1912–1917.
 East Perth Football Club (Western Australia): 1918–1923.

Coaching career

East Perth
Aged 33, Matson found his calling when he was appointed as coach of East Perth Football Club in 1918.  Matson worked on the players' confidence and garnered their respect with a methodical approach to his coaching. He was lauded for his ability to outwit opponents and exploit weaknesses. Matson's dominant personality helped recruit some excellent players and a dynasty was rapidly built. In nine seasons between 1919 and 1927, East Perth won seven premierships and dominated Western Australian football. In total, he played in twelve premiership teams and, in the last ten years of his career, coached teams into nine finals.

WAFL
He was an essential part of the state team, as a selector for the successful 1921 Western Australian interstate carnival team, and as the coach of the 1924, and the 1927 teams that lost narrowly to Victoria. Controversially, he openly criticised Victorian officials in 1924 for encouraging violence against his team. This outburst came back to haunt him.

Castlemaine (BFL)
In 1925, Matson accepted an offer to coach the Castlemaine Football Club, in the Victorian goldfields, in the club's first year in the Bendigo Football League competition. He was cleared as both player (he played in 2 or 3 games) and as coach to Castlemaine in April 1925.

With Matson's coaching, Castlemaine made the 1925 Grand Final, but lost to South Bendigo by 14 Points: 7.12 (54) to 6.4 (40).

Richmond (VFL)
Impressed with his effort in lifting the team into the Grand Final, Richmond officials approached Matson with an offer to succeed Dan Minogue as the Tigers' coach for 1926. Matson accepted and relocated to Melbourne.

However, the Victorian Football League (VFL) refused Matson a permit to take up the job, which incensed both the club and prospective coach. It was variously suggested that the VFL officials had not forgotten Matson's outburst two years earlier, or that they disapproved of his "unconventional" lifestyle.

Western Australia
Matson returned to Perth in time for the football season, and was re-appointed to coach East Perth.  He took them to successive premierships. Matson had revenge on the VFL officials by inspiring Western Australia to two "spiteful, vicious, brutal" victories over Victoria in 1926.

Death
He died on 13 June 1928, from a fractured skull — an injury he sustained on 11 June 1928 (as the only passenger) in an accident on Hampden Road in Nedlands, when a truck driven by his former team-mate Horrie Bant, careered off the road, crashed through the bush, and collided with a post carrying overhead tram wires. Both men were thrown from the vehicle. Although injured, Bant survived the crash, and died in 1957. Matson struck the post with his head.<ref>[http://nla.gov.au/nla.news-article39351520 Gay, Tasman, "Phil Matson is Remembered: Star footballer and outstanding football personality, his accidental death was a great blow to his many friends and admirers", The Westen Mail, (Thursday, 12 June 1952), p.21.]</ref>

Survived by his former wife, their two sons (Glenn and Cliff), and his de facto wife Catherine Thompson, née Owens,Public Notices: Re the Late Philip H. Matson, The West Australian, (Saturday, 18 August 1928), p.13. he was buried at Karrakatta Cemetery on 15 June 1928.The Last Tribute: A Scene from Yesterday's Funeral (of Phil Matson), The (Perth) Mirror, (Saturday, 16 June 1928), p.4.Harry Kneebone's World of Sport: Unmarked, The (Adelaide) Advertiser, (Friday, 25 June 1948), p.8.

Legacy
He played an important role in the process of making Australian football professional by openly negotiating fees that made him the highest paid Western Australian player and coach of the time.

Subiaco Football Club
He was selected at centre half-forward in Subiaco's "Team of the Century".

East Perth Football Club
He was selected as coach of East Perth's (1906-1944) "Team of the Century".

Western Australia Sesquicentennial
In 1979 he was honoured with the bronze tablet for 1926, set into the footpath along St Georges Terrace, Perth as part of the WAY '79 sesquicentennial (150th anniversary) celebrations of the colonisation of Western Australia by Europeans.

Western Australian Hall of Champions
In 1986, Matson was inducted into the Western Australian Institute of Sport's "Western Australian Hall of Champions".

West Australian Football Hall of Fame
In 2004 he was an inaugural inductee into the WAFL Hall of Fame.

Australian Football Hall of Fame
Inducted into the coaching division of the Australian Football Hall of Fame in 2004, Matson's citation reads:

See also
 1908 Melbourne Carnival
 1911 Adelaide Carnival
 1914 Sydney Carnival
 1924 Hobart Carnival
 1927 Melbourne Carnival
 Australian Football Hall of Fame
 West Australian Football Hall of Fame
 Western Australian Hall of Champions

Footnotes

References
 Glossop, Matthew (ed), East Perth 1906–1976, Matthew Glossop, (Perth), 1976.
 Hunt, Lyall, "Matson, Phillip Henry (1884–1928)", Australian Dictionary of Biography, Volume 10, 1986.
 Stannage, Tom (ed), A New History of Western Australia, University of Western Australia Press, (Nedlands), 1981.
 Western Australian National Football League, Football 150'', Promotional Graphics, (Perth), 1979.

External links

 WAFL Hall of Fame
 Australian Football Hall of Fame

1884 births
1928 deaths
Australian Football Hall of Fame inductees
Sturt Football Club players
West Perth Football Club players
East Perth Football Club players
Subiaco Football Club players
North Fremantle Football Club players
Boulder City Football Club players
East Perth Football Club coaches
Subiaco Football Club coaches
Australian rules footballers from Adelaide
Australian rules footballers from Western Australia
South Bunbury Football Club players
West Australian Football Hall of Fame inductees
World record setters in swimming
Australian male freestyle swimmers
Road incident deaths in Western Australia
Burials at Karrakatta Cemetery